Mailtraq is a commercial mail and groupware server. It runs on Microsoft Windows.

Features
The email server offers POP3, SMTP, HTTP, IMAP4 all with SSL/TLS support, plus NNTP, and provides webmail functionality.
It includes Bayesian anti-spam classification, and interfaces natively with Spamassassin. It also provides a SyncML service to allow direct synchronization for contacts and calendars with the BlackBerry, iPhone and similar devices.

Versions
The first release of the product (then named "Fastraq Mail Server") was in 1996.

The current version is 2.17

Editions

There are two editions:

Professional - contains all features
Essential - contains basic SMTP, POP3 and mailbox functions

A Proxy function is available as an add-on for either edition.

There is also a free version called "Mailtraq4Home" that is limited to 4 users.

Databases
The software stores messages in a database. The current version provides three database options:

AFV/IDX is the original storage method, with each mailbox having a dedicated pair of files
Firebird is a SQL database, storing all mailboxes in the same file
AFX is the latest database option, with each mailbox being stored in a separate file (but without the need for a sidecar IDX file)

See also 

 Comparison of mail servers
 List of mail server software

Windows multimedia software
Windows-only software